Forest Haven was a state school for children and adults with intellectual disability (ID) located in Laurel, Maryland and operated by the District of Columbia. The site was opened in 1925 and closed on October 14, 1991, by order of a federal judge after years of alleged abuse, medical incompetence, and several deaths from aspiration pneumonia.

Overview
Forest Haven opened in 1925 as a farm-like institution geared towards educating its patients with useful life skills.  It encompassed nearly 300 acres and contained 22 separate buildings, and at its height housed well over one thousand patients.  Its decline began in the 1960s as funding was cut and the population grew to include persons with non-ID conditions such as epilepsy.  In 1974, Forest Haven received at least 20 individuals from a nearby orphanage "Junior Village" which had closed. A lawsuit filed by families of patients at Forest Haven in 1976 and joined by the Department of Justice in 1978 resulted in the relocation of many residents to group homes, but the facility continued to operate, even allowing a physician with a suspended medical license to continue practicing there.

Between 1989 and 1991, prior to the facility's closure, the Justice Department began to monitor deaths from aspiration pneumonia, a condition that can be caused by improper feeding procedures (e.g. feeding a patient who is lying down).  There are also accounts of rampant physical, mental, and sexual abuse at the facility.  Prior residents have reported being hit with "belts, switches, and baseball bats." Missing teeth and other dental problems are commonly reported. Many of the residents who died were buried in a mass grave, unmarked until a headstone – noting 389 individuals – was erected by some of the patients' families in 1987.  Some of the graves have been uncovered by erosion.

Today, the site is abandoned and is cared for by United States Park Police, but remains a popular attraction for urban explorers. Many hazardous items such as asbestos have been removed, but much of the equipment, including desks, beds, toys, and medical records remain.

Timeline and history

References

External links
 "Abandoned Home for the Abandoned: Forest Haven Asylum." Sometimes Interesting. 12 Apr 2014
How We Made the #TheForestHavenStory Happen. Huffington Post. 08 Dec 2015.

Hospital buildings completed in 1925
Psychiatric hospitals in Maryland
Buildings and structures in Laurel, Maryland
1925 establishments in Maryland
1991 disestablishments in Maryland
Hospitals disestablished in 1991
Defunct hospitals in Maryland